Tamluk Assembly constituency is an assembly constituency in Purba Medinipur district in the Indian state of West Bengal.

Overview
As per orders of the Delimitation Commission, No. 203 Tamluk Assembly constituency is composed of the following: Tamluk municipality, Bishnubarh II, Pipulberia I, Pipulberia II and Uttar Sonamui gram panchayats of Tamluk community development block, and Sahid Matangini community development block.

Tamluk Assembly constituency is part of No. 30 Tamluk (Lok Sabha constituency).

Members of Legislative Assembly

Election results

2021

2016

 
  

 
 
 

.# Swing calculated on Congress+Trinamool Congress vote percentages taken together in 2011.

2011

 
  

 

.# Swing calculated on Congress+Trinamool Congress vote percentages taken together in 2006.

1977-2006
In the 2006 state assembly elections Jagannath Mitra of CPI won the 203 Tamluk assembly seat defeating his nearest rival Chittaranjan Maiti of Trinamool Congress. Contests in most years were multi cornered but only winners and runners are being mentioned. Nirbed Roy of Trinamool Congress defeated Santosh Rana of CPI in 2001. Anil Mudi of Congress defeated Surajit Bagchi of CPI in 1996 and 1991. Surajit Bagchi of CPI defeated Anil Mudi of Congress in 1987. Biswanath Mukherjee of CPI defeated Sukumar Das representing ICS in 1982 and representing Congress in 1977.

1951-1972
Ajoy Mukherjee representing Indian National Congress won in 1972, representing Bangla Congress won in 1971, 1969 and 1967, and earlier representing Congress won in 1962, 1957 and in independent India's first election in 1951.

References

Assembly constituencies of West Bengal
Politics of Purba Medinipur district